Tyrnävä is a municipality in the North Ostrobothnia region of Finland with a population of 
().
which 
is water. The population density is
. The municipality is unilingually Finnish.

The most important product of Tyrnävä is potatoes. The municipality has a lot of seed potato production, and the Tyrnävä's region is defined as one of the four high-quality seed potato growing areas in the European Union.

Notable people
 Väinö Kirstinä (1936–2007)

References

External links

Municipality of Tyrnävä – Official website

Municipalities of North Ostrobothnia
Populated places established in 1865